Igor Dmitrievich Rostorotsky (born 4 February 1962) is a retired Soviet Greco-Roman wrestler who competed in the superheavyweight division. He won both the world and European titles in 1985 and 1987. He was the first, and one of only two wrestlers to defeat Aleksandr Karelin, having won the 1987 championship of the Soviet Union.

Rostorotsky was born in Russia, but later moved to Kazakhstan and graduated from the Karagandy State University with a degree in law.

References

Living people
1962 births
Soviet male sport wrestlers
World Wrestling Championships medalists
European Wrestling Championships medalists